The Matignon Agreements were agreements signed in the Hôtel Matignon by Jean-Marie Tjibaou and Jacques Lafleur on 26 June 1988 between loyalists who wanted to keep New Caledonia as a part of the French Republic, and separatists, who did not. The agreements were arranged under the aegis of the Government of France as a result of discussions and compromises arranged by Christian Blanc, the negotiator for Michel Rocard's government.

Description
The accords set up a ten-year period of development. Institutional and economical provisions were made for the Kanak community. The New Caledonians agreed not to raise the independence issue during this period.

The agreements provided amnesty for those involved in the Ouvéa cave hostage taking incident of 1988, and interdicted all proceedings in regard to the deaths of four gendarmes and 19 members of the independentist Kanaks.

The Matignon Agreements were approved by French and New Caledonian voters in a referendum held on 6 November 1988, in which voters were asked "Do you agree to allow New Caledonian residents to vote for self-determination in 1998?". A majority voters – 80% – voted for New Caledonian residents to determine whether or not to institute self-determination. The voter participation in the referendum was 37%, with 12% of the ballots blank or void.

On 5 May 1998 the Nouméa Accord was signed under the aegis of Lionel Jospin. It scheduled a twenty-year transition until a planned vote on the transfer of sovereignty in 2018. The territory will be fully autonomous, except for the fields of defence, security, the judiciary, and finance, which will be competencies of France. The accord was approved by 72% of voters in a referendum in New Caledonia held on 8 November.

References

History of New Caledonia
Treaties concluded in 1988
Treaties entered into force in 1988
Treaties of France
1988 in France
1988 in New Caledonia
Treaties of New Caledonia